Al-Atatra is a northwestern neighborhood in the city of Beit Lahiya in the northern Gaza Strip. Its residents, the majority of whom are farmers or landowners are not Palestinian refugees, unlike most of the population in the Gaza Strip, including Beit Lahiya. A major cash crop in al-Atatra are strawberries which were mainly exported to Israel and the West Bank before Israel's siege of the Gaza Strip following the territory's control by Hamas, a Palestinian paramilitary and political organization. 

Israel considers al-Atatra a political stronghold of Hamas. Al-Atatra was the target of assaults by the Israel Defense Forces (IDF) during the Gaza War in 2008–09. At least 16 civilians were reported killed, including five who belonged to the same family, during the first few days of the war. Between 40 and 50 houses were destroyed as well.

References

North Gaza Governorate
Villages in the Gaza Strip